The 1960 Pacific typhoon season had no official bounds; it ran year-round in 1960, but most tropical cyclones tend to form in the northwestern Pacific Ocean between June and December. These dates conventionally delimit the period of each year when most tropical cyclones form in the northwestern Pacific Ocean.

The scope of this article is limited to the Pacific Ocean, north of the equator, and west of the International Date Line. Storms that form east of the dateline and north of the equator are called hurricanes; see 1960 Pacific hurricane season. Tropical storms formed in the entire west Pacific basin were assigned a name by the Joint Typhoon Warning Center. Tropical depressions in this basin had the "W" suffix added to their number.

Systems

Tropical Depression Ivy

Tropical Depression Jean

Tropical Storm Karen 

An area of disturbed weather in the Philippine Sea moved westward and organized into a tropical depression on April 22. It moved northwestward through the Philippines, strengthening quickly to a typhoon on the 24th due to its small size. Karen turned to the northeast, and despite favorable conditions, rapidly weakened until dissipation on the 26th. Karen left 56 dead in the Philippines, left 7,000 homeless, and caused $2 million (1960 USD) in crop and property damage.

Typhoon Lucille 

Lucille was identified as a weak tropical depression on May 25 to the east of the Philippines. Tracking northwestward, the system failed to develop and warnings on it were discontinued on May 27. At the same time, a second system began organizing along the west coast of Luzon. The two systems ultimately merged into one over the Philippines between May 28 and 29. Now tracking northeastward, the system re-intensified and became a tropical storm on May 30. As it accelerated over open waters, the system brushed the islands of Iwo Jima and Chichi-jima before transitioning into an extratropical cyclone on June 1. The remnants of Lucille were last noted on June 4 near the International Date Line.

Between May 27 and 29, heavy rains fell across much of Luzon as Lucille developed. The worst of the floods took place during the overnight hours of May 28 to 29. During that time, hundreds of homes were swept away and an estimated 300–500 people, including at least 80 children, were killed. Monetary losses from the floods exceeded $2 million.

Typhoon Mary 

A trough of low pressure spawned a tropical depression in the South China Sea on June 3 and moved slowly westward. Favorable conditions allowed it to quickly strengthen into Tropical Storm Mary, and after turning northward it attained typhoon status on the 7th. After weakening while moving northeastward over China, the storm restrengthened over the Western Pacific to a typhoon on the 10th. It passed near Okinawa, weakened, and accelerated to the east until it became extratropical on the 13th.

Also known as Bloody Mary, the typhoon was the worst to hit Hong Kong in 23 years (since the worst typhoon on the record of Hong Kong hit on 2 September 1937). Its  of rain, mudslides, and strong winds caused extreme damage across Hong Kong and southern China, leaving over 100 dead and over 18,000 homeless. The only positive aspect of the storm was its rainfall, which helped end a severe drought in the colony. An additional 1,600 people were killed following more landslides triggered by the remnants of the storm.

In addition to its impact in Hong Kong, Mary brought heavy rains and flooding in Taiwan, especially in the capital city of Taipei. Moderate crop damage was seen to the rice crop. Four fishermen drowned off the island's southern coast, but there were no fatalities on the island. Despite its effects, the name Mary was not retired.

Typhoon Nadine

Typhoon Olive 

On June 23, a tropical depression developed to the east of the Philippines. Due to lack of inflow from the archipelago to its west, Olive weakened to a  typhoon at the time of its eastern Philippine landfall. It rapidly weakened while crossing to a tropical storm, but restrengthened into a typhoon in the South China Sea. It turned to the west, and struck southern China on June 29 as a  typhoon. Olive rapidly weakened over land and the northern Gulf of Tonkin and dissipated on July 1.

A storm surge of 6–8 feet flooded much of Manila, causing extensive property and transportation damage. Rains, amounting up to  triggered flooding and numerous landslides. About 80 percent of the crops in southeast Luzon were destroyed by the flooding, and 404 people were killed. At least 32,000 buildings were destroyed by the storm, resulting in $30 million in damages. In addition, nearly 60,000 people were left homeless in the period after the storm's passage. During rescue attempts, many coastal defense force ships were either sunk or ran aground due to  swell produced by Olive.

China and Hong Kong received heavy rainfall from Olive, causing moderate crop damage, though there were no reported casualties there.

Typhoon Polly 
Polly hit near Beijing.

Tropical Storm Rose

Typhoon Shirley 

On July 29, a tropical depression formed to the east of northern Luzon. Shirley continued to the northwest, and struck northeastern Taiwan as a slightly weaker  typhoon on the July 31. The mountainous terrain ripped apart the typhoon's circulation, and after crossing the Taiwan Strait, it made landfall on southeastern China as a tropical storm. Shirley turned northward while moving inland, and dissipated on August 2. An unusual feature of the storm was the development of a secondary center while approaching Taiwan.

Shirley's  winds and torrential rains devastated Taiwan, overflowing many rivers and trapping thousands. Nearly a foot of rain was reported on the island, causing extensive road and property damage. Little crop damage occurred due to Typhoon Mary destroying much of it months before. In all, Typhoon Shirley caused 104 fatalities, destroyed or damaged 9,890 houses, and left 50,194 people homeless.

Typhoon Trix 

Trix left four more dead and brought more severe flooding to the typhoon-ravaged country.

JMA Tropical Storm Ten

Typhoon Virginia 

Typhoon Wendy

Tropical Storm Agnes

Typhoon Bess

Typhoon Carmen 

A sharp trough of low pressure organized into a tropical depression on August 16. It moved northward, quickly strengthening to an  typhoon. Carmen lost intensity as it continued to the north, and made landfall on South Korea as a  tropical storm on the 23rd. The storm brought  waves to the Korean peninsula, flooding coastal cities and sinking ships offshore. In all, Carmen caused 24 casualties and $2 million in damage (1960 USD).

Carmen is known for having the largest eye of any tropical cyclone in recorded history, tied with Typhoon Winnie in 1997.

Typhoon Della 

The monsoon trough spawned a tropical storm in the open Western Pacific on August 20. Della moved to the northwest, strengthening to a typhoon on the 22nd before looping to the north-northwest. It accelerated to the northeast and became extratropical on the 31st. A landslide on Nishinomiya killed 38 road workers, while another 17 people were killed throughout the country from heavy flooding. Damages from the storm were estimated at $19 million.

Typhoon Elaine

Typhoon Faye

Tropical Depression Gloria

JMA Tropical Storm Nineteen

Tropical Storm Hester

Tropical Depression Irma

Typhoon Judy

Typhoon Kit 

A large circulation over the Western Pacific organized into a tropical depression on October 2. Kit made landfall on the eastern Philippines at that intensity on the 6th and quickly crossed the archipelago. It turned to the northwest over the South China Sea and struck eastern Hainan Island on the 11th. Kit turned to the southwest, and after weakening hit northeastern Vietnam as a minimal tropical storm on the 13th. Kit dissipated shortly thereafter.

Many small and large boats sank from Kit's 1000+ mile wide circulation, with 149 fishermen missing. In the Philippines, Kit's extensive rainfall caused severe damage to property and transportation damage. Especially damaged was the rice crop, which was affected during the rice harvesting season. In all, Kit caused 149 casualties (with 149 missing) and $3 million in damage. Extensive crop damage occurred as well in China.

Typhoon Lola 

Typhoon Lola hit the Philippines just days after Kit made landfall, resulting in an additional $15 million in damage, much of it to the rice crop. 58 people were killed from the flooding, and heavy damage occurred to highways and communication systems.

Typhoon Mamie 

Typhoon Mamie struck Iwo Jima with winds of  then passed to the southeast of Tokyo. No damage was reported.

Typhoon Nina

Typhoon Ophelia 

The most unusual tropical cyclone of the year began its life on November 21 in the open Western Pacific. The depression drifted, first to the west, then to the southeast, then back to the west, varying between a tropical depression and an open trough of low pressure. After a northward turn, it strengthened into a tropical storm on the 27th and turned back to the southwest. Ophelia turned to a west drift, and under favorable conditions, intensified into a typhoon on the 29th. It continued to strengthen as it crossed over the Caroline Islands, and became a super typhoon on the 30th. Ophelia remained a Category 4 typhoons until December 4, when it began accelerating to the northeast over unfavorable conditions. After weakening to a tropical storm on the 6th, Ophelia became extratropical over the Northern Pacific Ocean. As an extratropical storm, it persisted until dissipating south of Alaska on the 8th. Ophelia brought heavy rains to the Caroline Islands, killing 2 and injuring 4. The name Ophelia was retired after this storm. Over the course of Ophelia's life, it traveled 5,000 miles.

Typhoon Phyllis

Other systems 

The China Meteorological Administration also monitored a severe tropical storm and several other tropical depressions during the course of the season.
 June 22–27,  1000 mbar (hPa)
 July 29 – August 3,  995 mbar (hPa)
 August 5–7,  997 mbar (hPa)
 August 13–16,  996 mbar (hPa)
 September 15–16,  998 mbar (hPa)
 September 22–27,  998 mbar (hPa)
 Unnamed Severe Tropical Storm: September 28 – October 5,  992 mbar (hPa)
 Storm crossed 100°E and entered the Northern Indian Ocean cyclone basin. This system ultimately developed into a very severe cyclonic storm, designated Cyclone 10B by the JTWC, with three-minute sustained winds of  before striking East Pakistan (modern-day Bangladesh). There, the storm damaged or destroyed roughly 35,000 homes and killed an estimated 3,000 people.
 November 8–10,  1005 mbar (hPa)

Storm names 

Since 1947, the Joint Typhoon Warning Center unofficially named typhoons in the Western Pacific Basin. This followed the widespread practice of naming storms during World War II map discussions after girlfriends. Before 1979, all names assigned to storms were female.

Retirement 

Following the 1960 season, Lucille and Ophelia's names were retired. The former was removed in light of the considerable loss of life in the Philippines; the latter was stricken due to its unusually long track. These were the first two names to ever be removed from the rotating naming list in the basin, though they were not replaced (although the names Lucy and Ora took their places in 1962 and 1963 respectively).

See also 

 1960 Atlantic hurricane season
 1960 Pacific hurricane season
 1960 North Indian Ocean cyclone season
 Australian region cyclone seasons: 1959–60 1960–61
 South Pacific cyclone seasons: 1959–60 1960–61
 South-West Indian Ocean cyclone seasons: 1959–60 1960–61

References 
Specific
 

 General

External links 

 Japan Meteorological Agency
 Joint Typhoon Warning Center .
 China Meteorological Agency
 National Weather Service Guam
 Hong Kong Observatory
 Macau Meteorological Geophysical Services
 Korea Meteorological Agency
 Philippine Atmospheric, Geophysical, and Astronomical Services Administration
 Taiwan Central Weather Bureau
 Digital Typhoon - Typhoon Images and Information
 Typhoon2000 Philippine typhoon website